Greatest Hits is the seventh and final album with (Constellation/MCA) by the group Klymaxx. It featured one song from group founder Bernadette Cooper's 1990 solo album Drama According to Bernadette Cooper, called "I Look Good", as well as a compilation of their greatest hits ("I Miss You", "I'd Still Say Yes", "The Men All Pause", "Meeting in the Ladies Room", "Man Size Love" and "Sexy"). This is the first greatest hits package released by Klymaxx. Another compilation was released in 2003 as part of the 20th Century Masters Millennium Collection.

Track listing
 "The Men All Pause"
 "I Miss You"
 "Meeting in the Ladies Room"
 "Man Size Love"
 "Sexy"
 "Divas Need Love Too"
 "Lock and Key"
 "I'd Still Say Yes"
 "Good Love"
 "I Look Good"

References

1990 greatest hits albums
Klymaxx albums